Diaphania superalis is a moth in the family Crambidae. It was first described by Achille Guenée in 1854. It is found in Mexico, Nicaragua, Guatemala, Colombia, Venezuela, Brazil, Ecuador, Bolivia and Peru. The habitat consists of rainforests and cloud forests.

The length of the forewings is 18–21 mm for males and 20–22 mm for females. Adults are similar to Diaphania hyalinata, but the brown bands are less broad compared to the size of the wing.

References

Diaphania
Moths described in 1854
Moths of North America
Moths of South America
Taxa named by Achille Guenée